The Central African Republic competed at the 1988 Summer Olympics in Seoul, South Korea. This marked the third appearance of the nation at a Summer Olympics. The country entered 15 competitors, the highest number of Central Africans appearing at any Games so far; with the basketball team comprising 12 of them. In addition to the boxers Fidèle Mohinga and Moussa Wiawindi, there was marathon runner Adolphe Ambowodé, who had previously competed at the 1984 Summer Olympics. No medals were won by any of those athletes.

Background
The Central African Republic made its debut in the Olympic Games at the 1968 Summer Olympics in Mexico City, Mexico. The country has twice boycotted the Olympic Games, first was because of the inclusion of the New Zealand team at the 1976 Summer Olympics despite the breach of the international sports boycott of South Africa by the nation's rugby union team shortly prior. Then in 1980, the country was one of several who joined in with a United States led boycott over the 1979 invasion of Afghanistan during the Soviet–Afghan War. The highest number of Central African athletes entered in a team for an Olympics is 15, occurring at both the 1988 and 1992 Summer Olympics.

Competitors
The following is the list of number of competitors in the Games.

Athletics

At his previous appearance the 1984 Summer Olympics, runner Adolphe Ambowodé completed the Men's marathon in a time of 2:41:26, finishing in 70th place. His time in the marathon at the 1988 Games was nearly 18 minutes faster, with the runner finishing in a time of 2:23:52 in 42nd place out of the 98 athletes completing the course. The result was the best performance by a Central African at an athletics so far.

Marathon

Basketball

The Central African team qualified for the Olympics following their victory at the FIBA Africa Championship 1987 in December that year. They were one of two African teams, alongside the basketball squad from Egypt.

Team roster

Group play

Classification round (9th–12th place)

Classification round (9th/10th place)

Boxing

The Central African Republic entered two boxers in the tournaments at the 1988 Summer Olympics, Fidèle Mohinga and Moussa Wiawindi. Mohinga competed in the welterweight class, defeating Adão N'Zuzi of Angola in the first round on 20 September. But, he was defeated by Maselino Masoe of American Samoa in the following round, four days later. Wiawindi was defeated in the first round of the light-middleweight tournament by Cameroon's François Mayo.

Boxing

Notes

References

Nations at the 1988 Summer Olympics
1988
Oly